Olivia Holdt (born 7 June 2001) is a Danish football player who plays as a midfielder for FC Rosengård and for the Denmark national team.

Club 
She was the sixth highest scoring player in the 2019-20 Elite Division.

She was named Player of the Year in the Elite Division 2020-21.

International career
She has appeared for the Danish national youth team and Danish national junior team, several times. In 2019, she made her debut for the Denmark national under-23 team, against Netherlands.

Holdt made her debut for the senior Denmark national team on 8 April 2021 against the Republic of Ireland, coming on as a substitute for Signe Bruun. She was also in the squad for the subsequent friendly against Wales.

International goals

Honours 
Elitedivisionen
Bronze Medalist: 2019, 2021
Player of the Year: 2021

References

External links
 Profile at the Danish Football Union
 Olivia Møller Holdt at Soccerdonna
 
 

2001 births
Living people
VSK Aarhus (women) players
Danish women's footballers
Denmark women's international footballers
Women's association football midfielders